Mikołaj Krzysztof Sapieha (1613–1639) of Lis coat of arms, was the Voivode of Nowogródek (1618–38), Voivode of Mińsk (1638–39), Notary of Lithuania since 1637 in the Polish–Lithuanian Commonwealth.

Mikolaj was the son of Krzysztof Stefan Sapieha and Anna Hołowczyńska. He was married to Zuzanna Korwin Gosiewska, and was the father of Jerzy Sapieha and Anna Sapieha.

His death is alleged to have been caused by poison, administered by his wife.

1613 births
1639 deaths
Mikolaj Krzysztof